Sandy Gbandi (born July 12, 1983 in Harbel) is a Liberian former footballer.

Career

Early life and college
Born near the Firestone rubber plantation, Gbandi and his family fled from his native Liberia to Houston, Texas following the outbreak of the First Liberian Civil War in 1989, when he was just six years old. Gbandi went on to attend Jersey Village High School, played club football for the Houston Dynamos and the Houston Texans as a youth, and played four years of college soccer at University of Alabama at Birmingham. Gbandi played in 56 games for UAB, scoring 10 goals and adding 14 assists. As a sophomore in 2004 he was selected First Team All-Conference USA and then was named Second Team All-Conference USA a year later.

Professional
Gbandi left school early when he was selected in the 2007 MLS Supplemental Draft by FC Dallas, but he never saw any first team-minutes with the team, and was waived at the end of the season.

Gbandi signed with the Puerto Rico Islanders in the USL First Division in 2008, helping the Islanders win the 2008 USL First Division regular season title and progressed to the semi-finals of the CONCACAF Champions League 2008–09. Gbandi stayed with Puerto Rico through the 2010 season.

On March 15, 2011, Gbandi signed with NSC Minnesota Stars of the second division North American Soccer League. He was released by the club on November 29, 2011.

Personal
Sandy's brother, Chris Gbandi, is also a former professional footballer. They played together at FC Dallas in 2007 and against each other in 2010, when Chris joined Miami FC.

Honors

Puerto Rico Islanders
USSF Division 2 Pro League Champions (1): 2010
Commissioner's Cup Winners (1): 2008
CFU Club Championship Winner (1): 2010

References

External links
 Puerto Rico Islanders bio
 MLS player profile
 UAB Blazers bio

1983 births
Living people
University of Alabama at Birmingham alumni
UAB Blazers men's soccer players
Liberian footballers
American soccer players
FC Dallas players
Puerto Rico Islanders players
Minnesota United FC (2010–2016) players
Liberian expatriates in Puerto Rico
USL First Division players
USSF Division 2 Professional League players
North American Soccer League players
Expatriate footballers in Puerto Rico
FC Dallas draft picks
Jersey Village High School alumni
Association football midfielders